Abu Zaabal or Abu Za'bal is a huge industrial settlement in Egypt.

The older name of the town is al-Quseir.

The first Egyptian medical school was founded there, in 1827. In modern Egypt, the area is an industrial suburb of Cairo, with an extensive military–industrial complex and well-developed chemical industries.

1970 bombing incident 
On February 13, 1970, an Israeli Air Force bomber dropped bombs and napalm on an industrial plant in Abu Za'abal, killing 80 civilian workers.

2013 prisoners die in custody incident 
In August 2013, 37 prisoners died in Abu Zaabal Prison.

References 

Industry in Egypt
Populated places in Qalyubiyya Governorate